Marston Marsh is a Local Nature Reserve in southwest Norwich, Norfolk, England.

References

External links

Parks and open spaces in Norwich
Local Nature Reserves in Norfolk